Fort Hughes may refer to:

Fort Hughes, Caballo Island, Philippines
Fort Hughes (Georgia)
Fort Hughes (Nova Scotia)